Warr or WARR may refer to:

 Warr Glacier, in Antarctica
 Warr Guitar
 WARR (AM) (1520 AM), radio station in North Carolina, USA
 Warr Acres, Oklahoma, a city in Oklahoma County, Oklahoma, United States
 WARR (TUM), a student group at the Technical University of Munich
 Warr (surname)
 Juanda International Airport (ICAO code WARR), in Sedati, Sidoarjo Regency, Indonesia